Positions is the sixth studio album by American singer Ariana Grande. It was released by Republic Records on October 30, 2020. Grande worked with numerous producers on Positions, including frequent collaborator Tommy Brown, accompanied by longtime co-writers Victoria Monét and Tayla Parx. Inspired by her "emotional healing", Grande desired to emphasize her vocals on the album.

Built around themes of sexual intimacy, attraction, and romantic devotion, Positions expands on the trap-infused R&B and pop sound of its predecessors, Sweetener (2018) and Thank U, Next (2019). Doja Cat, the Weeknd, and Ty Dolla Sign appear as guest features, alongside Megan Thee Stallion on the deluxe edition. Upon release, Positions was met with generally favorable reviews from music critics; Grande's vocal performance was often praised, though the album's lyrics and production style drew criticism. Publications ranked the album on various year-end best albums lists of 2020.

The title track was released as the lead single, which debuted atop the Billboard Hot 100 and marked Grande's fifth number-one single in the United States, making her the first act with five number-one debuts on the chart. The song was her third Hot 100 chart-topper in 2020, following "Stuck with U" and "Rain on Me". All 14 tracks on Positions charted simultaneously on the Hot 100, with the second single, "34+35", arriving at number eight on the chart and peaking at number two, following the release of its remix with Doja Cat and Megan Thee Stallion. In 2021, the album was promoted by a series of performances of its tracks, presented by Vevo, and the release of "POV" to US radio as the third single.

With the debut of Positions atop the Billboard 200, Grande earned her fifth number one album in the United States. It spent two consecutive weeks at number one in the country, was certified platinum by the Recording Industry Association of America, and became the eighth most consumed album of 2021 in the US. Elsewhere, the album reached number-one in Argentina, Canada, Croatia, Ireland, Lithuania, New Zealand, Norway and the United Kingdom. Positions contended for Best Pop Vocal Album at the 64th Annual Grammy Awards (2022); Grande tied Kelly Clarkson for the most nominations for an act in the category, with five each.

Background 
On April 19, 2020, it was first reported that Ariana Grande was working on new music. She also declared in May 2020 that she had recorded a song with Doja Cat earlier that year. In the same interview, however, Grande stated that she would not release an album during the COVID-19 pandemic lockdown. On October 14, 2020, Grande announced on social media that her upcoming sixth studio album would be released the same month. Three days later, she posted a slow-motion video in which she types out the word "positions" on a keyboard. That same day, Grande's official website launched two countdowns counting down to October 23, 2020, and October 30, 2020. On October 23, 2020, she confirmed via her Twitter account that the album was coming on October 30 and posted the cover art. The tracklist was revealed the following day. Grande released three slightly different Positions album covers on her social media. Each of them are beauty shots of the singer in black and white with varied posing. The covers were shot by Dave Meyers (who also directed the title track's music video), with creative direction by Stefan Kohli.

Music and lyrics 

Musically, Positions is an R&B and pop record with trap inflections. Its tracks also contain elements of hip hop, neo soul, disco, funk, microhouse, electro house, and orchestral pop. Grande's vocals have been described as evoking mumble rap.  The opening track, "Shut Up", has been described as "a jewel box of an orchestral-pop number in which the singer tells off people too concerned with how she spends her time". The second track, "34+35", has sexually suggestive lyrics. The third track, "Motive", is a collaboration with Doja Cat. Grande had declared the two worked on a track together during an interview in May 2020. The two would collaborate again on the remix of "34+35" alongside American rapper Megan Thee Stallion. "Off the Table" is a collaboration with the Weeknd, and "tackles the idea of loving after loss head-on and with grace". "Six Thirty" sees Grande "[shatter] established language norms and creates a new metaphor paradigm, comparing a person to a very specific hour of the day as represented on a clock". Vulture's Rachel Handler described "My Hair" as "a witty, clever little ditty about reassuring an uneasy lover that it is, indeed, okay to touch Ariana Grande's almost frighteningly giant ponytail. It's also a classic horny bait and switch, kicking off like a sexy, swingy, '70s-esque doo-wop about fuckin'." The eleventh track, "Love Language", is described as "disco-meets-new jack swing". PopSugar and Idolator respectively reported that "Off the Table" sampled "2009" by Mac Miller, while "West Side" sampled "'One in a Million' by Aaliyah". According to the liner notes, there are no officially credited samples in the album.

Release and promotion 
On October 27, Grande announced that limited-edition CDs of Positions with two alternate cover artworks are to be released in conjunction with the album, and were made available for preorder on Grande's website.

The album was released on October 30, 2020. The same day, limited quantity of Positions standard edition CDs, autographed by Grande, were issued DTC on the website. On February 19, 2021, a deluxe edition of Positions was released, featuring five additional tracks. The deluxe version was released on CD on March 26, 2021. On April 9, 2021, the vinyl of the standard edition of the album was released, including a glow-in-the-dark variant, available exclusively at Target.

In July 2021, Positions was promoted by a series of live performances of some of its tracks, presented through Vevo.

Singles 
The title track, "Positions", accompanied by its music video, was released on October 23, 2020, as the album's lead single. "Positions" debuted atop the US Billboard Hot 100, becoming Grande's fifth number-one single and extending her record of having the most number one debuts of any artist in history. Spending 17 weeks in the top 10 of the Hot 100, it tied "Thank U, Next" as Grande's longest-running top 10 single in the United States. The track also peaked at number one on the US Mainstream Top 40 airplay chart in December 2020, becoming Grande's seventh number one single and 17th top ten single on the chart. It remained at the top position for seven consecutive weeks there, becoming Grande's longest running number one single on the pop airplay chart, surpassing "7 Rings". Internationally, "Positions" was a similar commercial success, topping record charts in 11 countries and reaching the top ten in 30 other countries. In April 2021, "Positions" was certified double platinum by the RIAA, for shipments of over 2 million units in the United States.

"34+35" was released on October 30, 2020, serving as the second single from the album. Its debut at number eight on the Hot 100 marked Grande's 18th career top ten single, tying her with Beyoncé for the eighth-most top ten entries among women. Following the release of its remix, "34+35" reached a peak of number two on the chart dated January 30, 2021, becoming Grande's 12th top five hit in the United States. The track also peaked at number one on the US Mainstream Top 40 airplay chart in February 2021, becoming Grande's eighth number one single and second number one single from Positions. It unseated the title track, which was atop the chart for seven consecutive weeks, making Grande the first artist to replace herself at number one with two solo songs. It remained at the top position for three consecutive weeks. The track also peaked at number one on the U.S. Rhythmic Top 40 airplay chart, becoming Grande's third number one single there. In April 2021, "34+35" was certified double platinum by the RIAA, for moving over 2 million units in the United States.

"POV" was sent to American adult contemporary radio stations on April 19, 2021, as the album's third single. Following the release of the album, "POV" debuted at number 40 on the Hot 100, later peaking at number 27. "POV" entered the top ten of the US Mainstream Top 40 airplay chart at number ten on the issue dated May 15, 2021. It became the third consecutive top ten hit from Positions and Grande's 19th top ten single. The same week, Grande yielded three songs in the top ten of pop airplay chart; the title track, "34+35" and "POV", making her the first artist to post three concurrent top ten hits in the survey's history.

Critical reception 

Positions received generally favorable reviews from music critics, most of whom agreed that Grande "does not break any new ground" with it. At Metacritic, which assigns a normalized rating out of 100 to reviews from mainstream critics, the album has an average score of 72 based on 24 reviews, indicating "generally favorable reviews".

Louise Bruton of The Irish Times labeled Positions a "big orgy of breathless R&B songs" that solidify Grande as one of pop music's leading voices, despite the scarcity of "bangers". Mary Siroky of Consequence of Sound detailed the album as "showy", "wildly theatrical", filled with romance and flirtation, establishing a blend of Dangerous Woman (2016), Sweetener (2018) and Thank U, Next (2019), while dismissing the guest appearances as its weakest songs. Pitchforks Dani Blum wrote that Grande is "both in love and scared of it" in Positions, as she tries to heal herself in "new giddy romance"; Blum further noticed that the album does not broaden her sound "the way her past few albums have". Brenton Blanchet of Clash gave plaudits for its "beautifully layered" orchestrations and sweet harmonies, but felt that Grande stays inside a comfort zone, in a genre "she's all too familiar with". Vulture's Craig Jenkins appreciated the "effortless" vocals, and pinpointed how the album is "risqué and unsubtle" in nature, but underlined its safe formula and presence of filler tracks. Hannah Mylrea of NME affirmed that Positions is "jaw-droppingly good fun", however, observed that the washy melodies result in indistinct songs, deficit of Grande's "trademark sparkle".

Chris DeVille of Stereogum lauded the "impeccable" vocals, but downplayed the "least stimulating" production. He dubbed Positions as a solid Grande album, but deemed it a premature "disappointment" in comparison to Sweetener and Thank U, Next. The Telegraph's Kate Solomon described it as "sultry sexjams and thinly veiled euphemisms" with X-rated lyrics, softened by Disneyfied strings, but despite the singer shining new confidence, Positions "doesn't quite hit the spot". Carl Wilson of Slate classified the album as Grande's "most shamelessly sexed-up set" and "back-to-basics-plus album" with relaxed and familiar music, that turns "bedroom calisthenics" and "mundane" romance into "bubbly pop fodder", yet avowed that it feels trivial amidst her other projects. The Independent writer Adam White highlighted the album's push-and-pull dynamic, but felt the singer sticks to her comfort zone, and noted that Positions has "Spotify syndrome"—short songs to aid playlisting.

David Smyth of Evening Standard praised Grande's voice as "a thing of great beauty", but remarked that she "isn't firing as hard as she was when she released her last two albums". Alexis Petridis of The Guardian concluded that the album proceeds at a tiring pace, causing the individual tracks blur into "one long slow-motion shot", without a climax. Naming Positions a misstep in Grande's career, The Faders Shaad D'Souza denounced its conversational style of vocals, "low-effort" lyrics and trend-chasing production. He thought the songs lacked distinction and punch, dissolving into a "swamp of icy drum hits and aimless melisma". Calling it a product of pandemic fatigue, Alexa Camp of Slant Magazine wrote that Positions leans on "the same midtempo trap-pop" that were on Grande's previous albums, and criticized the lyricism for its "empty" pillow talk and repetitive hooks. Bobby Olivier of Spin found the album "sultry yet forgettable", with several "uninspired" or "unmemorable" tracks.

Year-end lists 
Several publications listed Positions in their rankings of best albums of 2020. Additionally, some of its tracks were also named amongst best songs of 2020: "Positions", "34+35", "POV", "Just like Magic", "Nasty", "My Hair", "Motive", "Love Language", "Six Thirty", and "Off the Table".

Awards and nominations

Commercial performance

United States 
Positions debuted at number-one on the US Billboard 200 chart, with 174,000 album-equivalent units, which included 173.54 million on-demand streams and 42,000 album sales, in its first week. This became Grande's fifth US number one debut and the fourth album by a female artist to reach number one in 2020. At the time of its release, Positions achieved the highest one-week total for an album since bundles and concert ticket offers stopped factoring into chart and sales rankings (October 9, 2020). Positions marked Grande's third number-one album in under two years and three months, which was the fastest accumulation of three number one albums by a woman at that time. It became Grande's fifth chart-topper on the Billboard Top Album Sales chart.

All 14 tracks of Positions charted simultaneously within the top 75 of the US Billboard Hot 100, issue dated November 14, 2020, becoming Grande's second consecutive album to do so, following Thank U, Next (12 songs). Grande's career Hot 100 count expanded to 66 entries, the fourth-most among women. In its second week, the album remained at number one on the chart, with a furthered 83,000 units and 99.5 million on-demand streams. It was her second consecutive album to spend its first two weeks at number one, following Thank U, Next. In its third week, the album slipped to number four on the chart, moving over 75,000 units.

Following the release of the deluxe version, Positions ascended to the second spot of the Billboard 200 on the chart dated March 6, 2021, moving 49,000 units in its seventeenth week. After its vinyl and cassette release, Positions returned to number six on the chart dated April 24, 2021, earning 54,000 units in its twenty-fourth week. The album also peaked atop the Billboard Vinyl Albums Chart in the week ending April 15, 2021, becoming Grande's first chart-topper there. Having sold around 32,000 vinyl LPs that week, it held the former record for the largest vinyl sales week by a female artist since MRC Data began tracking sales in 1991. On April 6, 2021, Positions was certified Platinum by the Recording Industry Association of America (RIAA) for moving a million units in the US.

As of the July 2021 MRC Data report, Positions was the tenth most consumed album of 2021 thus far, having earned 707,000 units in the year's first six months. Overall, Positions landed at number eight on the Billboard 200 year-end chart for 2021, while being the third-biggest album amongst female artists, behind Olivia Rodrigo's Sour and Taylor Swift's Evermore. Additionally, three Positions songs landed on the Hot 100 year-end chart of the same year, with "Positions" at number 14, "34+35" at number 21 and "POV" at number 87.

Other territories 
In the United Kingdom, Positions debuted at number one on the UK Albums Chart, becoming her fourth number one album. For the second time, Grande achieved a chart double with the title track at number one as well. Grande achieved this in 2019, when her album Thank U, Next and single "Break Up with Your Girlfriend, I'm Bored" topped the album and singles chart simultaneously. She is the fourth artist, and first female artist, to achieve a chart double in 2020, following Drake, Eminem, and Stormzy, and the second female to achieve this feat twice since Rihanna in 2011. In April 2021, Positions also topped the UK's Official Vinyl Albums Chart.

In Canada, Positions debuted at the top spot of Billboard Canadian Albums chart, yielding Grande her fourth Canadian number-one album and third consecutive number-one album. It remained at number one for two consecutive weeks. All 14 tracks of Positions charted on the Canadian Hot 100 simultaneously—Grande's third album to do so, after Sweetener and Thank U, Next. The title track became Grande's fifth Canadian number-one hit and "34+35" debuted at number eight and later peaked at number five, becoming Grande's eighteenth top ten hit in the country. Positions was the 11th biggest album of 2021 on the Billboard Canadian Albums chart (fourth amongst female artists).

In Ireland, Positions debuted atop the Irish Albums Chart, becoming Grande's fourth consecutive number one album in the country. It was the most downloaded and most streamed album of the week. Joining Madonna, Beyoncé and Taylor Swift, Grande became the fourth female soloist to claim at least four number-one albums on the Irish Albums Chart. The title track became Grande's seventh chart-topper on the Irish Singles Chart and spent three consecutive weeks at number one in the country, while "34+35" peaked at number four.

Aided by Positions, Grande placed at number eight on the list of best-selling artists of the world in 2020 by International Federation of the Phonographic Industry, ranking third amongst women.

Track listing 
Credits adapted from the liner notes and Tidal.

Notes 
  signifies a co-producer
  signifies an additional producer
  these contributors are only credited on digital releases of the album
 Physical releases of Positions credit Doja Cat and the Weeknd as featured artists instead of co-lead artists on "Motive" and "Off the Table", respectively.

Personnel 
Credits adapted from Tidal.

Musicians 

 Ariana Grande – songwriting, lead and backing vocals 
 Doja Cat – lead vocals  and featured vocals 
 The Weeknd – lead vocals and backing vocals 
 Ty Dolla Sign – featured vocals and backing vocals 
 Megan Thee Stallion – featured vocals 
 Peter Lee Johnson – strings 
 Madison Calle – harp 
 Gerry Hilera – concertmaster 
 Paula Hochhalter – cello 
 Ross Gadsworth – cello 
 David Walther – viola 
 Rodney Wirtz – viola 
 Ana Landauer – violin 
 Ashoka Thiaragarajan – violin 
 Ellen Jung – violin 
 Gerry Hilera – violin 
 Lorand Lokuszta – violin 
 Mario De Leon – violin 
 Michele Richards – violin 
 Neil Samples – violin 
 Phillip Levy – violin 
 David Campbell – string arrangements 
 Dammo Farmer – bass 
 Tarron Crayton – bass 
 James Jarvis – guitar 
 Murda Beatz – drums 
 Zachary Foster – programming

Production 

 Tommy Brown – production, executive production
 Mr. Franks – production , co-production 
 Peter Lee Johnson – production 
 Travis Sayles – production , co-production 
 Xavi – production , co-production 
 Murda Beatz – production 
 Shea Taylor – production , co-production 
 Shintaro – production 
 Nami – production , co-production 
 Keys Open Doors – production 
 The Rascals – production 
 Scott Storch – production 
 Tommy Parker – production 
 London on da Track – production 
 Josh Conerly – production , co-production 
 Oliver "Junior" Frid – production 
 Pop Wansel – production 
 Sam Wish – production 
 Zachary Foster – production 
 Ariana Grande – executive production, vocal production , vocal arrangement 
 Tayla Parx – vocal production 
 Joseph L'Étranger – co-production 
 Anthony M. Jones – co-production 
 Charles Anderson – co-production 
 Ammar Junedi – co-production 
 Marqueze Parker – co-production 
 Yonatan Watts – co-production

Technical 

 Randy Merrill – mastering
 Şerban Ghenea – mixing
 Mike Dean – mixing 
 Ariana Grande – engineering 
 Billy Hickey – engineering 
 Brendan Morawski – engineering 
 Sam Ricci – engineering 
 Shawn "Source" Jarrett – engineering 
 Brandon Wood – assistant recording engineering 
 Andrew Keller – assistant recording engineering 
 Sean Klein – assistant recording engineering

Charts

Weekly charts

Year-end charts

Certifications

Release history

See also 
 Album era
 List of Billboard 200 number-one albums of 2020
 List of UK Albums Chart number ones of the 2020s
 List of number-one albums of 2020 (Canada)
 List of number-one albums of 2020 (Ireland)
 List of number-one albums from the 2020s (New Zealand)
 List of number-one albums in Norway

References 

2020 albums
Albums produced by London on da Track
Albums produced by Murda Beatz
Albums produced by Scott Storch
Albums produced by Tommy Brown (record producer)
Albums impacted by the COVID-19 pandemic
Ariana Grande albums
Republic Records albums
Trap music albums